The 2019 Laver Cup was the third edition of the Laver Cup, a men's tennis tournament between teams from Europe and the rest of the world. It was held on indoor hard courts at the Palexpo in Geneva, Switzerland from 20 until 22 September.

Team Europe successfully defended their title for a third consecutive year, winning the tournament 13−11.

Player selection
On 13 December 2018, Roger Federer and Rafael Nadal were the first players to confirm their participation for Team Europe. During the 2019 Madrid Open, Stan Wawrinka expressed interest in participating in the event with Federer, but he instead played at the St. Petersburg Open in Russia. 

On 14 June 2019, Dominic Thiem, Alexander Zverev and Fabio Fognini announced their participation for Team Europe. 

On 3 July 2019, Kevin Anderson, John Isner, Milos Raonic and Denis Shapovalov were announced for Team World. 

Stefanos Tsitsipas and Nick Kyrgios were both confirmed for the event on 13 August 2019. As his final picks, Team World captain John McEnroe chose Jack Sock and Taylor Fritz, with Fritz replacing the injured Anderson.

Prize money 
The total prize money for 2019 Laver Cup is set at $2,250,000 for all 12 participating players.

Each winning team member will pocket $250,000, which marks no increase in prize money compared to 2018.

Whereas, each of the losing team members will earn $125,000 each.

Participants

Matches 
Each match win on day 1 was worth one point, on day 2 two points, and on day 3 three points. The first team to 13 points won. Since four matches are played each day, there were a total of 24 points available. However, since 12 of the total points were earned on day 3, neither team could win prior to the final day of play.

Player statistics

References

External links

2019
Tennis tournaments in Switzerland
2019 in Swiss tennis
Sports competitions in Geneva
September 2019 sports events in Switzerland